Mary Elizabeth Kennedy (1911–1991) is an American artist associated with the Gee's Bend group of quilters. Her work is included in the collection of the Metropolitan Museum of Art.

Early life 
Mary Elizabeth was born in Boykin, Alabama to Reverend Spurllin Pettway and his wife on a sharecropping and subsistence farm. Their main crops were cotton and sorghum. Kennedy married Houston Kennedy and they bore 12 children. 

She died at 80 years old in a car crash returning to Boykin from Selma.

References

1911 births
1991 deaths
20th-century American women artists
20th-century American artists
Quilters
Artists from Alabama